The 1966 Eastern Michigan Hurons football team represented Eastern Michigan University as an independent during the 1966 NCAA College Division football season. In their second and final season under head coach Jerry Raymond, the Hurons compiled a 5–3–1 record and outscored their opponents, 100 to 87.

In August 1967, Eastern Michigan athletic director Frosty Ferzacca announced that Raymond was being replaced as head coach by Dan Boisture. Although Raymond had served as head coach for two full seasons, Ferzacca stated that "Raymond was serving as our interim coach." Raymond compiled an 8–7–2 record in two seasons as the school's "interim" head coach.

Schedule

References

Eastern Michigan
Eastern Michigan Eagles football seasons
Eastern Michigan Hurons football